Maurice Béjart (1 January 1927 – 22 November 2007) was a French-born dancer, choreographer and opera director who ran the Béjart Ballet Lausanne in Switzerland. He developed a popular expressionistic form of modern ballet, talking vast themes. He was awarded Swiss citizenship posthumously.

Biography
Maurice-Jean Berger was born in Marseille, France, in 1927, the son of French philosopher Gaston Berger. Fascinated by a recital of Serge Lifar, he decided to devote himself entirely to dance. In South France days, he had studied under Mathilde Kschessinska.

In 1945, he enrolled as a corps de ballet at the Opéra de Marseille. From 1946, he had studied under Madam Rousanne (Sarkissian), Léo Staats, Madam Lyubov Yegorova and Olga Preobrajenska at "Studio Wacker", etc. in Paris.

In 1948, he also trained with  Janine Charrat, Yvette Chauviré and then with Roland Petit, in addition he had studied under Vera Volkova at London.

In 1954, he founded the Ballet de l'Étoile company (dissolved in 1957). In 1960 he founded the Ballet du XXe Siècle in Brussels (dissolved in 1987).

In 1973, with the Ballet du XXe siecle, he premiered "Golestan", on a poem by Sa'di, based on Iranian traditional music. The ballet was commissioned by the Shiraz-Persepolis Festival of Arts where it was premiered. The first performance of "Improvisation sur Mallarme III" with music by Boulez also took place at that Festival in 1973. "Farah", also based on Iranian traditional music was the Ballet's own commission, premiered in Brussels in 1976 and brought to the Shiraz-Persepolis Festival that same year. The 1976 Festival also witnessed the first performance of "Heliogabalus", based on a poem by Artaud. The Festival's patron was Farah Pahlavi, the former Empress of Iran, with whom Béjart kept strong ties to the end.

In 1987 he moved to Lausanne in Switzerland, where he founded the Béjart Ballet Lausanne. 

Among his works is a thoroughly revised version of The Nutcracker, presumably inspired by his own life story, which he staged in 2000. It still uses Tchaikovsky's original score, but completely scraps the original plot and characters, instead supplying a new story about a boy's efforts to re-connect with his mother. We also are given a look into the boy's strange sexual fantasies. The production design is full of erotic images — some of which are most likely shocking to many, such as wombs and vaginal openings. One of the characters is Marius Petipa, who becomes Mephisto. Another character is called Felix the Cat, presumably after the famous cartoon character. The production has been issued on DVD.

Boléro
One of Béjart's masterpiece works of dance was choreography he set to French composer Maurice Ravel's "Boléro." In The New York Times, Jennifer Dunning described Béjart's "Bolero" as "probably his best known and most popular dance."  Created in 1960 for the Yugoslav ballerina Duška Sifnios, the dance features a dancer on a tabletop, surrounded by seated men, who slowly participate in the dance, culminating in a climactic union of the dancers atop the table.  Amongst the dancers, who would later perform Béjart's interpretation of "Bolero," include Sylvie Guillem from the Paris Opera Ballet, Grazia Galante, Maya Plisetskaya, Angele Albrecht, and Roberto Bolle. In a twist, Jorge Donn also played the role of the principal dancer, becoming the first male to do so. One of Donn's such performances can be seen in French filmmaker Claude Lelouch's 1981 musical epic, Les Uns et les Autres.

Dance schools
Béjart was the founder of several dance schools:
the Mudra School in Brussels, 1970–1988;
the Mudra Afrique School in Dakar, 1977–1985;
the Rudra School in Lausanne, 1992–2007.

Awards
During his lifetime, Béjart received many awards and distinctions for his contributions to the arts.

 He received the Japanese Order of the Rising Sun.
 He received the Belgian Ordre de la Couronne.
 In 1974, he won the Erasmus Prize.
 In 1994, he was appointed to the Académie des Beaux Arts.
 Also in 1994, he received the Deutscher Tanzpreis.
 In 2003, he was appointed Commandeur des Arts et des Lettres.
 Also in 2003, he won the Prix Benois de la Danse for lifetime achievement.

Filmography
1975: Je suis né à Venise with Jorge Donn, Shonah Mirk, Philippe Lison and Barbara

References

External links
Béjart Ballet Lausanne
Rudra Béjart School

Obituary in The Guardian UK

1927 births
2007 deaths
Entertainers from Marseille
Ballet choreographers
Modern dance
Swiss male ballet dancers
French choreographers
Kyoto laureates in Arts and Philosophy
Naturalised citizens of Switzerland
Prix Benois de la Danse winners
Dance directors of La Monnaie
Recipients of the Praemium Imperiale
LGBT dancers
French LGBT entertainers
People from Lausanne
French expatriates in Switzerland
Converts to Islam
French Muslims
20th-century LGBT people